Somerleyton Swing Bridge is a railway swing bridge over the River Waveney on the Norfolk-Suffolk border.

It was built in 1905 to carry the double tracked Norwich to Lowestoft Line over the river, replacing a previous single tracked bridge. It is one of only four remaining railway swing bridges crossing rivers in The Broads.

References

Railway bridges in Norfolk
Bridges in Suffolk